The 5th IAAF World Athletics Final was held at the Gottlieb-Daimler-Stadion in Stuttgart, Germany on September 22 and September 23, 2007.

Results

Men

Women

See also
2007 in athletics (track and field)

References

Results
2007 IAAF World Athletics Final results. IAAF. Retrieved 2018-03-25.
Results (Archived). IAAF. Retrieved 2018-03-25.
5th IAAF World Athletics Final. IAAF. Retrieved 2018-03-24.

External links
Official 2007 IAAF World Athletics Final Site (archived)

World Athletics Final
Sports competitions in Stuttgart
International athletics competitions hosted by Germany
IAAF World Athletics Final
World Athletics Final
2000s in Baden-Württemberg